Gladys Muriel Porter, MBE, née Richardson, daughter of Walter Richardson and Christina Macpherson, (August 4, 1893, Sydney, Nova Scotia, Canada – April 30, 1967, Kentville, Nova Scotia, Canada) was the first woman in the Maritimes to be elected as Mayor, and the first female Member of the Nova Scotia House of Assembly.

Porter was elected to Kentville town council in 1943. She was then elected Mayor of Kentville in 1946 and served until 1960, when she ran successfully as a Progressive Conservative to represent the provincial electoral district of Kings North.

Porter was re-elected to the Legislature in 1963 and served until her death on April 30, 1967.

References

External links
 Portrait of Gladys Porter
 Nova Scotia Legislature - Frequently Asked Questions - Nova Scotia Women MLAs

1893 births
1967 deaths
Women MLAs in Nova Scotia
Progressive Conservative Association of Nova Scotia MLAs
Women mayors of places in Nova Scotia
Mayors of places in Nova Scotia
Women municipal councillors in Canada
20th-century Canadian women politicians
Canadian Members of the Order of the British Empire